Volker Hauff (born 9 August 1940) is a German politician of the Social Democratic Party (SPD).

Political career
Since 1959, Hauff has been a member of the SPD. From 1969 to 1989 he was a member of the Bundestag.

Hauff served as Federal Minister of Research and Technology from 1978 to 1980, Federal Minister of Transport from 1980 to 1982 and Mayor of Frankfurt am Main from 1989 to 1991.
He is a descendant of the Swabian poet Wilhelm Hauff.

Other activities
 German Council for Sustainable Development (RNE), Member (2001-2010, appointed ad personam by Chancellor Gerhard Schröder)

Publications

References

External links 
Biography at Friedrich Ebert Foundation

1940 births
Living people
People from Backnang
Transport ministers of Germany
Social Democratic Party of Germany politicians
Grand Crosses with Star and Sash of the Order of Merit of the Federal Republic of Germany